The Makatote Viaduct (Bridge 179) takes the North Island Main Trunk railway (NIMT) across the Makatote River.

It was built between 1905 and 1908 for the Public Works Department (PWD), who passed it to New Zealand Railways Department (NZR) in 1909.

When built it was tallest, and is now the third tallest, viaduct in New Zealand, the higher ones being the 1981 North Rangitikei , further south on the NIMT, and 1937 Mohaka viaduct , on the Gisborne line.

Design and construction 
Like most of the other NIMT viaducts, Makatote was designed by Peter Seton Hay, later PWD Engineer-in-Chief. Piers 1, 2, 3, 9, 10 and 11 are of reinforced concrete with piers 4 to 8 being steel trestles on reinforced concrete footings. Pier 6 is the highest.

Tenders were called on 15 May 1905. Christchurch firm, J. & A. Anderson & Co, won the bid a month later. The viaduct was estimated to cost £43,132, but the final cost was said to be £53,369 ($8.6m at 2016 prices) in 1908, though £56,251 was shown in a 1912 parliamentary paper. Two years were stipulated to complete the contract, but there were problems with foundations, weather, floods, shortage of cement in 1907 and "want of sufficient suitable men".

Equipment, materials and stores seem to have been shipped by two routes. Some went to Whanganui and were barged up the Whanganui River to Pipiriki, then by bullock or horse teams, and later traction engine, to Makatote. Later, some went via Auckland, then by train to Oio (open by early 1906), and along a new access road (now SH4). As the railhead crept south, the road haul reduced; Raurimu by 10 May 1907, Erua on 1 April 1908.

Rather than transport girders from their base in Lyttelton, on 25 June 1906, Andersons opened a large foundry, ( x ) to fabricate the steel on site. It was powered by a wood-burning boiler and steam engine, with electric lights and machines. Electric overhead travelling cranes and a cableway (or Blondin) eased on-site transport. A water turbine drove the stone crusher and concrete mixer (adverts from the period said they used 9,000 bags of Portland Cement).

The last girder was placed on 4 June 1908, following which the cableway was dismantled to allow earthworks and track laying to be completed on 3 August 1908.

Check rails prevented a derailed tender falling off the viaduct in 1949.

Maintenance and upgrades 
Although designed for 84 ton locos, 94 ton X Class were built for opening the line. Strengthening of all NIMT bridges from 1925 to 1932 allowed axle loads up to 14 tons and 135 ton K and 145 ton Ka classes. Further work from 1983 to 1989 added brackets on the west of the viaduct for electrification masts and strengthening for 105 ton EF Class electrics, with 18 tonne axle loads and higher tractive forces.

River erosion caused problems for the foundations either side of it.  Pier 6 was underpinned in 1981-82 with two new  cylinders and prestressed concrete caps. Caps were also added to Piers 3 and 9, which were also vertically prestressed.

On the other side, Pier 7 was threatened. During the privatisation period repairs were minimal, so that, although the risk was being monitored, nothing was done. When ONTRACK took over in 2004, it assessed Makatote as its highest structural risk, since much of it could collapse, especially if there was an earthquake. In 1906 Pier 7 had been found to have a "rotten foundation" and so had a deeper footing.

The work was completed on schedule at the end of February 2007, despite having to cope with a spring, heavy rain, snow and winds.

The viaduct was given Category 1 listing by the New Zealand Historic Places Trust in 2009.

Access was by two 4 ton pier access gantries and used 330 tons (or 272 tons) of scaffolding hanging below the bridge.

In both 2007 and 2014 efforts were made to protect the rainbow and brown trout and a family of whio nesting very close to the viaduct. In 2007 silt traps were built and work scheduled to minimise disruption during the spring breeding season. Weekly checks of the river were also made and KiwiRail funded rat and stoat trapping along the banks of the river until 2019.

Station 

During construction the camp operated as a lunch stop for passengers on the coach between the temporary railheads at Ohakune and Raurimu.

Makatote closed on 4 January 1909, 5 months after the through line was opened and shortly before it was handed over to NZR.

A few months after electrification, on 13 September 1986, a new passing loop opened at Makatote.

See also 
Makatote Tramway

References

External links 

 Google Maps Street View
Photos
 Alexander Turnbull Library - 1908 construction, 1908, 1910, 1913, 1968
 Papers Past - 1912, Daylight Limited with NZR WAB class in 1930 and 1936
 Sir George Grey Special Collections, Auckland Libraries -  1905 workmen at camp, 
 1906 - road bridge, 1880s road bridge, bullock team at camp, camp and Ruapehu, concrete shuttering, flooding, flood damage, foundry, pack bridge, pack & road bridges, pier foundations, digging foundations, rock crusher, work site, 
 1907 - camp in winter, electric cableway, inside foundry, township in winter, view from south, 
 1908, connecting coach, going through camp, carriage and coach, cutting & foundry, tramway in cutting, widening cutting, concrete pier, pier, part-built bridge, township, worker's hut in winter, truss girder, first truss, lowering last truss, near completion, viaduct & Ruapehu, in snow, road & railway bridges, loco on viaduct, final coach run, latticework.
 1909, Ruapehu from viaduct, tramway & viaduct, load testing, road bridge.
 1910 Sir Joseph Ward & Lord Kitchener on bridge.
 1963 freight train
 Group photo of co-operative workmen 1909 (page xiv)
 New Zealand Railways Magazine 1931  1936
 1963 image on a 2008 postage stamp

Railway bridges in New Zealand
Steel bridges in New Zealand
Ruapehu District
Rail transport in Manawatū-Whanganui
Heritage New Zealand Category 1 historic places in Manawatū-Whanganui
Bridges in Manawatū-Whanganui
Viaducts in New Zealand